St Twrog's Church may refer to:

St Twrog's Church, Bodwrog
St Twrog's Church, Maentwrog